Manerba del Garda is a town and comune in the province of Brescia, in Lombardy. It is located at the southwest side of the Lake Garda.

It is bounded by the comunes of San Felice del Benaco, Puegnago sul Garda, Moniga del Garda, Polpenazze del Garda and Soiano del Lago.
Manebra del Garda is divided into the seven hamlets of Solarolo, Montinelle, Balbiana, Pieve, Trevisago, Campagnola and Gardoncino.

History

Manerba was founded, according to the legend, in devotion to the goddess Minerva. Other historians trace the name to the Gauls Cenomani, stemming from the union of the terms mon, leader, and erb, a military zone, identifying Manerba as residence of the chief of the tribe. A charter of Frederick II dating from 1 November 1221 mentions the territory surrounding the ancient Church of Manerba as Tenense, whence its current name,  Valtenesi.

The presence of man in the Garda area goes back to prehistoric times: in the Manerba area are remains of a Mesolithic village, while under natural terrace located in the foothills of the  Rocca (castle) are traces of a Neolithic settlement from between 4,500 and 4,000 BC, and an important necropolis dating from the Copper Age.

The Valtenesi saw the construction of several castles starting from the 13th century AD, some of which erected on the ruins of Roman forts. The tower of the castle in the center of Manerba represents the convergence point of a radial pattern that connects the towers of all the municipalities around. This is the oldest castle in the Valtenesi, built in the 12th/13th centuries on the ruins of a medieval fortress and of a settlement dating to the Iron Age, and is firmly anchored on the Manerba cliffs hanging over the southern basin of Lake Garda.

Main sights
Manerba is home to several prehistoric pile-dwellings (or stilt house) settlements that are part of the Prehistoric Pile dwellings around the Alps UNESCO World Heritage Site.

Manerba houses the Rocca di Manerba del Garda which is characterized by several archaeological sites.

Municipal government 
The  is chaired by the mayor, who appoints others members, called .

Since 1995 the mayor of Manerba is directly elected by citizens, originally every four, then every five years. The current mayor is Flaviano Mattiotti (FI), elected on 26 May 2019 with the 53.4% of the votes.

Gallery

References

Cities and towns in Lombardy
Populated places on Lake Garda